A general election was held in the U.S. state of Wyoming on Tuesday, November 8, 1938. All of the state's executive officers—the Governor, Secretary of State, Auditor, Treasurer, and Superintendent of Public Instruction—were up for election. After losing all of the statewide executive offices in 1934, Republicans made up some ground; they won elections for Governor, Treasurer, and Superintendent, while Secretary of State Lester C. Hunt and Auditor William M. Jack won decisive re-elections.

Governor

Secretary of State
Incumbent Secretary of State Lester C. Hunt ran for re-election to a second term. He was initially challenged by Doc Rogers, the former Deputy Secretary of State, but after the deadline, Rogers attempted to switch places on the ballot with W. K. Mylar, who was initially running for State Auditor. Hunt's office refused to allow Rogers to withdraw and be replaced by Mylar, but the state supreme court ordered the office to accept the filings. Accordingly, Hunt was challenged by Mylar, a physician. Despite the success of the Republican Party elsewhere in the state, Hunt had little difficulty defeating Mylar by a solid margin, winning his second term.

Democratic primary

Candidates
 Lester C. Hunt, incumbent Secretary of State

Results

Republican primary

Candidates
 W. K. Mylar, physician, 1926 Republican candidate for Secretary of State

Results

General election

Results

Auditor
Incumbent Democratic Auditor William M. Jack ran for re-election to a second term. He was initially challenged by physician W. K. Mylar, but the Republican Party successfully substituted Doc Rogers for Mylar after filing closed following a successful court challenge.

Democratic primary

Candidates
 William M. Jack, incumbent State Auditor

Results

Republican primary

Candidates
 Doc Rogers, former Deputy Secretary of State

Results

General election

Results

Treasurer
Incumbent Democratic State Treasurer J. Kirk Baldwin was barred from seeking a second term due to term limits. Pat Flannery, the Chairman of the Wyoming Democratic Party, won a close primary to succeed Baldwin and advanced to the general election, where he faced Republican Matt Christensen, the former Deputy Assessor of Carbon County. Ultimately, Christensen defeated Flannery by a slim margin, flipping the Treasurer's office back to the Republican Party.

Democratic primary

Candidates
 Pat Flannery, Chairman of the Wyoming Democratic Party, former State Representative, 1934 Democratic candidate for Secretary of State
 Frank Clark, Cheyenne businessman
 Perry Williams, rancher

Results

Republican primary

Candidates
 Matt Christensen, former Carbon County Deputy Assessor

Results

General election

Results

Superintendent of Public Instruction
Incumbent Democratic Superintendent of Public Instruction Jack R. Gage ran for re-election to a second term. Following his narrow victory in the 1934 Democratic primary, he faced an intraparty challenge from one of his 1934 opponents, Maude Sholty. However, he defeated Sholty by a wide margin and advanced to the general election, where he was opposed by Republican nominee Esther L. Anderson, a junior high school teacher. Despite Gage's large victory four years earlier, he fell victim to the strong Republican performance in Wyoming and narrowly lost re-election to Anderson.

Democratic primary

Candidates
 Jack R. Gage, Sheridan teacher
 Maude Sholty, former State Director of Special Education, 1934 Democratic candidate for Superintendent

Results

Republican primary

Candidates
 Esther L. Anderson, junior high school teacher

Results

General election

Results

References

 
Wyoming